The Lake Rudolf lampeye (Micropanchax rudolfianus) is a species of fish in the family Poeciliidae. It is endemic to Lake Turkana (formerly known as Lake Rudolf) in Kenya and south western Ethiopia. Within the lake it is found in shallow water among vegetation, spawning in the littoral zone and feeding on small insects and zooplankton.

References 

Fish described in 1932
Lake Rudolf Lampeye
Endemic freshwater fish of Kenya
Fish of Lake Turkana
Taxa named by E. Barton Worthington
Taxonomy articles created by Polbot
Taxobox binomials not recognized by IUCN